Glen Arbor may refer to;

 Glen Arbor, California, an unincorporated community in Santa Cruz County
 Glen Arbor, Michigan, an unincorporated community in Leelanau County
 Glen Arbor Township, Michigan, in Leelanau County

See also
 Glenarbon, Queensland, Australia